The Mississippi River Squadron was the Union brown-water naval squadron that operated on the western rivers during the American Civil War. It was initially created as a part of the Union Army, although it was commanded by naval officers, and was then known as the Western Gunboat Flotilla and sometimes as the Mississippi Flotilla. It received its final designation when it was transferred to the Union Navy at the beginning of October 1862.

History

American Civil War

The squadron was created on May 16, 1861, and was controlled by the Union Army until September 30, 1862.  John Rodgers was the first commander of the squadron and was responsible for the construction and organization of the fleet. Flag Officer Andrew H. Foote relieved Rodgers and encouraged the army commander in the west, Major General Henry W. Halleck, to authorize an expedition down the Tennessee River against Fort Henry.  Operating in conjunction with Ulysses S. Grant's Army of the District of Cairo, Foote subdued Fort Henry before Grant's troops could take their positions.

Foote led the squadron in the attack on Fort Donelson and then joined with Maj. Gen. John Pope's Army of the Mississippi for a joint attack on Island No. 10 on the Mississippi River. Charles H. Davis relieved Foote and proceeded to take Fort Pillow on the Mississippi. The U. S. Ram Fleet, commanded by Colonel Charles Ellet, Jr., accompanied the squadron during the Battle of Memphis.  After the capture of Memphis the squadron was transferred to the control of the U.S. Navy. The transfer included the Ram Fleet, by then reconstituted as the Mississippi Marine Brigade. Davis aided Grant's unsuccessful first campaign against Vicksburg.  Rear Admiral David D. Porter relieved Davis in command and led the squadron at Arkansas Post and during the successful Vicksburg Campaign and siege of the city.

Red River Campaign
Porter led the squadron during the disastrous Red River Campaign of 1864, and when the waters of the river dropped, the fleet was almost lost.  The engineering abilities of Colonel Joseph Bailey, who supervised the construction of Bailey's Dam, helped save the fleet.  During the Red River Campaign, the Mississippi Squadron was composed of 10 ironclads, 3 monitors, 11 tin-clads, 1 timber-clad, 1 ram and various support vessels, including vessels in the following table:

Command temporarily passed to Alexander Pennock before Samuel P. Lee assumed command. Lee was in command until the squadron was discontinued on August 14, 1865.

List of Commanding Officers

See also

Mississippi River in the American Civil War
Mississippi Marine Brigade
United States Ram Fleet

References
Eicher, John H. and Eicher, David J. (2001) Civil War High Commands, Stanford University Press, 
 Konstam, Angus, New Vanguard 56, Union River Ironclad 1861-65, Osprey Publishing, 2002. 
 
Nevin, David (1983) The Road to Shiloh: Early Battles in the West, The Civil War series, Alexandria, VA : Time-Life Books, 

Union Navy
Ship squadrons of the United States Navy
Mississippi in the American Civil War
Tennessee in the American Civil War
Riverine warfare
1861 establishments in the United States